Michael or Mike Farmer may refer to: 
 Michael Farmer, Baron Farmer, British businessman and life peer
 Mike Farmer (basketball), American basketball player and coach
 Mike Farmer (baseball), Major League Baseball pitcher